Nicholas Kharkongor is an Indian film director. He made his directorial debut with his 2012 film Fair and Lowly. His feature films includes the 2016 Mantra and the 2019 Axone.

Life and career
Nicholas Kharkongor was born in Shillong, Meghalaya to a Khasi family. He did his early education in Nagaland and later completed his graduation in economics from St. Edmund's College, Shillong.

Kharkongor directed the 2016 film Mantra, starring Rajat Kapoor,  Kalki Koechlin, Shiv Panditt, and Lushin Dubey. He achieved further success with his 2019 comedy drama film Axone.

Filmography
 Fair and Lowly (2012) – director
 Mantra (2016) – director 
 Axone (2019) – director

References

External links

Living people
Indian film directors
People from Shillong
Khasi people
Year of birth missing (living people)